Maymunah Yusuf Kadiri is a Nigerian mental health advocate, Psychiatrist and psychotherapist. She advocates for mental health speaking at events, television shows and as a columnist at the Guardian Newspapers. She produced Little Drops Of Happy in 2017 to create awareness about mental health in Nigeria. She is the founder of Pinnacle Medical Services Limited.

Education 
Maymunah trained at Federal Neuro-Psychiatric Hospital, Yaba till 2012. She is a graduate of the China European International Business School. She is also a trained rational emotive and cognitive behavioural therapist from Albert Ellis Institute, New York, USA. She is a Goldman Sachs scholar in Entrepreneurial management and Fellow of the National Post-Graduate Medical College of Physicians (FMCPsych).

References 

Women in Red 2019
Nigerian women medical doctors
Nigerian columnists
Women columnists
Year of birth missing (living people)
Living people